K245 or K-245 may refer to:

K-245 (Kansas highway), a former state highway in Kansas
HMCS Fredericton (K245), a former Canadian Royal Navy ship
K.245 Church Sonata No. 11 in D (1776) by Mozart